Octotemnus is a genus of tree-fungus beetles in the family Ciidae.

Species
 Octotemnus aculeatus Kawanabe, 2002
 Octotemnus chinensis J.-K. Li, 1992
 Octotemnus glabriculus Gyllenhal, 1827
 Octotemnus japonicus Mityatake, 1954
 Octotemnus laminifrons Motschulsky, 1861
 Octotemnus mandibularis Gyllenhal, 1813
 Octotemnus michiochujoi Kawanabe, 2005
 Octotemnus omogensis Miyatake, 1954
 Octotemnus opacus Mellié, 1848
 Octotemnus parvulus Miyatake, 1954
 Octotemnus pilosoceps Kawanabe, 2002
 Octotemnus punctidorsum Miyatake, 1954
 Octotemnus robustus Kawanabe, 2002
 Octotemnus rugosopunctatus Drogvalenko, 2002

References

Ciidae genera